Bieger is a German language surname. It is a nickname for a quarrelsome or pugnacious person. Notable people with the name include:

Andrea Bieger (1959), German gymnast
Charles Bieger (1844–1930), German soldier
Jana Bieger (1989), American former gymnast of German descent

References 

German-language surnames
Surnames from nicknames